Kwon Soon-chun (born April 24, 1959 in South Korea ) is a retired South Korean boxer.

Professional career

After turning professional in 1977 he had compiled a record of 21-2-1 in 6 years before unsuccessfully challenging for the WBA super flyweight championship against Jiro Watanabe in 1983. He fought Rene Busayong for the vacant IBF world title and won by 5th-round knockout. After a successful six title defenses he ended up losing the title to Chung Jong-kwan in 1985.

Professional boxing record

See also
List of flyweight boxing champions

References

External links

1959 births
Living people
South Korean male boxers
Flyweight boxers
Super-flyweight boxers
World flyweight boxing champions
International Boxing Federation champions